Escobaria, pincushion cactus or foxtail cactus is a genus of low-growing cacti that range from the southernmost parts of central and western Canada through  northern Mexico, with one species in Cuba. The genus comprises about 23 species. The term "pincushion cactus" may also refer to the related Mammillaria.

The stems of Escobaria range from globose to cylindrical, and lack nectar-secreting glands; while ribs are absent, tubercles are present, tending to become corky and deciduous as they age. The flowers usually appear in spring and may have a variety of colors, while the fruits are almost always red. The seeds in this genus are notable for being deeply pitted.

Common species include the Missouri foxtail cactus E. missouriensis, widespread in grassland and forest west of the Mississippi, and the spinystar E. vivipara, distributed across the US and into Canada, first described by Nuttall in 1813.

Escobaria was defined by Nathaniel Britton and Joseph Rose in their major work The Cactaceae (1923); they named the genus after Rómulo and Numa Escobar. The cacti of this genus bear many similarities to Coryphantha and Mammillaria. Two species were recently moved to Acharagma.

Taxonomy
The following genera have been brought into synonymy with Escobaria:
Cochiseia W.H.Earle
Escobesseya Hester
Fobea Fric (nom. inval.)
Neobesseya Britton & Rose

Species

References

 Anderson, Edward F. (2001) The Cactus Family Timber Press, Portland, Oregon, pp. 307–314, 
 Genus Escobaria Eng/De/Cz

External links

 
Cactoideae genera